Pangasinan's 2nd congressional district is one of the six congressional districts of the Philippines in the province of Pangasinan. It has been represented in the House of Representatives of the Philippines since 1916 and earlier in the Philippine Assembly from 1907 to 1916. The district consists of the provincial capital, Lingayen, as well as adjacent municipalities of Aguilar, Basista, Binmaley, Bugallon, Labrador, Mangatarem and Urbiztondo. It is currently represented in the 19th Congress by Marcos Juan Bruno O. Cojuangco of the Nationalist People's Coalition (NPC).

Representation history

Election results

2022

2019

2016

2013

2010

See also
Legislative districts of Pangasinan

References

Congressional districts of the Philippines
Politics of Pangasinan
1907 establishments in the Philippines
Congressional districts of the Ilocos Region
Constituencies established in 1907